British Columbia's National Award for Canadian Non-fiction was a Canadian literary award. Awarded annually since 2005 by the British Columbia Achievement Foundation, it was the largest non-fiction prize in Canada, rising from $25,000 in its initial years to $40,000 in 2008.

In May 2018, the British Columbia Achievement Foundation announced that it was discontinuing the award as part of a process of refocusing the foundation's activities and programs.

Winners

References

External links
British Columbia's National Award for Canadian Non-fiction, official website.

Canadian non-fiction literary awards
Awards established in 2005
2005 establishments in British Columbia
2018 disestablishments in British Columbia
Awards disestablished in 2018